State Street station could refer to:
 New Haven State Street station in New Haven, Connecticut
 State station in Boston, Massachusetts
 State Street station (Atlantic Avenue Elevated), a former elevated station in Boston, Massachusetts
 State Street station (Illinois) in Chicago, Illinois
State/Lake station in the Chicago Loop